Nick Wall (born 24 February 2000 in Sheffield) is an English professional squash player.

As of May 2022, he was ranked number 58 in the world.

References

2000 births
Living people
English male squash players